The Rick and Bubba Show is an American comedy radio show based in Birmingham, Alabama. Nationally syndicated and produced at WZZK-FM, the show is live every weekday for five hours and is hosted by Rick Burgess and Bill "Bubba" Bussey.

The Rick and Bubba Radio Show
The radio program began on January 8, 1994. 

On February 11, 2008, the broadcast location of the show moved to the "Rick and Bubba Broadcast Plaza and Teleport" in Vestavia Hills, which houses the studio as well as management offices for the show. This location allows fans to witness the show from the sidewalk inside Vestavia Hills City Center, as well as from the "Golden Ticket" seats inside the studio.

In March 2009, The Rick and Bubba Show was heard on XM Radio Channel 158, but is no longer available satellite radio.

A televised version of the show premiered November 1, 2012 on Heartland. It lasted until February 1, 2016.  It had also been seen on the Turner South Network.

In January of 2022, The Rick and Bubba Show moved to their "No Name Studio" at Summit Media in Birmingham, which houses multiple radio stations that broadcast across the area.

Books
Their first book, Rick & Bubba's Expert Guide to God, Country, Family & Anything Else We Can Think Of, was published in March 2006, and quickly became a best-seller at Amazon.com and Books-A-Million as well as making the New York Times best seller list at the number 7 spot in the Miscellaneous category.
Rick & Bubba's Expert Guide to God, Country, Family & Anything Else We Can Think Of, March 2006
The Rick and Bubba Code: The Two Sexiest Fat Men Alive Unlock the Mysteries of the Universe, June 2007
Rick and Bubba for President: The Two Sexiest Fat Men Alive Take on Washington, June 2008.
Rick and Bubba's Big Honkin' Book of Huntin, September 2008
Rick and Bubba's Guide to the Almost Nearly Perfect Marriage, June 2009.
Rick and Bubba's Big Honkin' Book of Grub, March 2010
We Be Big: The Mostly True Story of How We Became Rick and Bubba, March 2011
These compilations were largely compiled into written dialogues directly taken from recorded audio.  The written word of the book proved to be no actual new literature from either host.  Rick Burgess nor Bill Bussey provided any literary content.

Audio recordings
Rick and Bubba have released "best of" CDs every year since 1998. The 2006 release Radio Gold, Volume 1, reached the number 9 spot on the Billboard Top Comedy Albums chart. 
 The Smell Of Success (1998)
 Stay In It! Volume 1 (1999)
 Stay In It! Volume 2 (1999)
 Hey Buddy... Ya Broadcasting (2000)
 A Radio Oddity (2001)
 She Commenced To Shaving (2002)
 Got It Like We Like It! (2003)
 How 'bout That! (2004)
 Pull Our Finger! (2005)
 Radio Gold (2006)
 ... and Cake (2007)
 14 Years and Still No Awards (2008)
 Radio Revolution (2009)
 I Don't Think We Got the Tools to Pull This Off (2010)
 Good Night Look at That! (2011)
 Triple Option (2012)
 Again.... Let Me Be Clear (2013)
 XXL One Score and Several Pounds Ago (2014)
 Wow! What a Wheel! (2015)
 Who's Got It Better Than Us? (2016)
 Can’t Have Nuthin’ (2017)
 Making Radio Great Again (2018)
 25 Big Ones (2019)
 Follow the Science...A Radio Pandemic (2020)
 Heard Immunity (2021)
 Where's The Bathroom? (2022)

References

External links

1964 births
Living people
American Christian writers
American comedy radio programs
American male voice actors
American radio personalities
American talk radio programs
Cox Radio
Male actors from Alabama
Mass media in Birmingham, Alabama
People from Birmingham, Alabama